Þuríður Einarsdóttir (Thuridur Einarsdottir), commonly known as Foreman Thuridur or Þuríður formaður, (1777 – 13 November 1863) was an Icelandic sea captain. Unusually for a woman, for over half a century she worked as an increasingly renowned fisherman, first as a deckhand then taking command of boats as "foreman", the term traditionally used for captain in Iceland. She is also known for helping to identify those behind the infamous  in 1827.

Early life
Born on the Stéttar (or Stéttir) farm near the village of Eyrarbakki in 1777, Þuríður Einarsdóttir was the daughter of Helga Bjarnadóttir and Einar Eiríksson, a farmer and a fisherman. She lived with her parents until she was 25. When she was 11, she started fishing on her father's boat in the spring. Following her father's death in the early 1790s, she fished both in the spring and autumn with her brother Bjarni. Finally, when in her twenties, she became a fully competent seafarer, able to go out in winter too with Foreman Jón in Móhús. Typically, the foreman of a fishing boat commanded a crew of about 15. At the time, the boats had no sails and were propelled with oars. While working, she dressed as a man.

Career

During the years 1802 to 1847 she spent most of her time on fishing boats, quickly developing her seamanship. Until 1830, she lived around Stokkseyri, spending a lengthy period in the village of Gata. It was during this period that she became a fishing boat foreman, first during the spring and autumn seasons and then, from 1816, for the winter season when she served as a foreman in Þorlákshöfn. After 1830, she lived mainly in Eyrerbakki but spent the years 1840–1847 working for merchants in Hafnarfjörður. While in Þorlákshöfn, she headed an eight-oar boat, proving to be a successful fisher.

Foreman Thuridur was considered a skillful and careful captain who was popular among her crew. She had a successful career and moved around along the south coast during her working life. Later in life, she earned her living working on a small farm. For two years, she lived with Erlendur Þorvarðarson in Eystri Móhús. Their daughter Þórdis died when she was five. In 1820, she married 21-year-old Jón Egilsson, one of her workers, but the marriage did not last. She retired in 1856 and when she stopped working she received financial support from the parish.

Foreman Thuridur is also known for having helped the authorities identify those involved in the infamous Kambi robbery in 1827. She recognized the pattern on a shoe dropped by one of the robbers and the mark of an anvil on an iron rod found at the site as having been crafted in a smithy belonging to Jón Geirmundsson in Stéttar. He turned out to be one of the robbers.

Remaining surprisingly healthy until the end of her days, Þuríður Einarsdóttir died on 13 November 1863 in Einarshöfn.

Memorial
In 1949, a replica of a turf-roofed fisherman's hut called Þuríðarbúð was erected in Stokkseyri in her memory. Close to the site of her own hut, it can be visited as a small museum.

References

Further reading
Sagan af Þuríði formanni og Kambsránsmönnum (The Story of Foreman Thuridur and the Kambur Robbery) by Brynjúlfur Jónsson (detailed 324-page biography in Icelandic)

1777 births
1863 deaths
18th-century Icelandic people
18th-century Icelandic women
19th-century Icelandic people
19th-century Icelandic women
Icelandic fishers